The North American YF-93 was an American fighter development of the F-86 Sabre that emerged as a radically different variant that received its own designation. Two were built and flown before the project was eventually canceled.

Design and development

In 1947, North American Aviation began a design study, NA-157, to create a true "penetration fighter" to meet the requirements of a long-range version of its F-86A Sabre. In order to accommodate more fuel, a much larger F-86A was envisioned, eventually able to carry , both internally and with two  underwing drop tanks. The resultant fighter originally designated the F-86C was intended to compete with the XF-88 Voodoo and Lockheed XF-90 to fulfill the USAF's Penetration Fighter requirement for a bomber escort.

The F-86C was much larger and heavier, weighing in at  more than its antecedent. The increased weight and girth necessitated a dual-wheel main landing gear, increased wing area and a more powerful engine, the Pratt & Whitney J48 rated at  static thrust and  thrust available in afterburner. With the SCR-720 search radar and six 20 mm (.79 in) cannon mounted in the nose where the air intake was on the F-86A, the engineers designed a novel set of flush-mounted NACA inlets. 

In December 1947, the Air Force ordered two prototype NA-157s and, considering the many changes to the F-86, redesignated it YF-93A. Both prototypes were built with NACA inlet ducts; the first, (48-317), was later retro-fitted with more conventional intakes. Six months later, the initial contract was followed up with an order for 118 F-93A-NAs. In 1949, the production order was abruptly canceled as priorities had shifted dramatically following the testing of the ground-breaking Boeing B-47 which reputedly would not need an escort due to its high speed capabilities. With the prototype YF-93As just coming off the production line, the USAF took over the project.

Operational history

The prototypes, serial numbers 48-317 and -318, began flight tests in 1950 and were entered in a flyoff against the other penetration fighter projects, the XF-88 and XF-90; the XF-88 Voodoo was declared the winner. None of the projects would be ordered. The YF-93As were turned over to the National Advisory Committee for Aeronautics (NACA) AMES facility for further testing before being utilized as chase aircraft until 1956. Flight with the NACA ducts proved troublesome at high angles of attack, restricting air flow to the engines. NACA Research Memorandum A7I06 'An experimental investigation of NACA submerged air inlets in a 1/5-scale model of a fighter airplane', Donald E Gault, Dec 1947 (from Cranfield repository)  By this time, however, higher performance aircraft were available and both aircraft were eventually declared surplus and scrapped.

Operators

 United States Air Force

Variants
F-86C
Original designation for a re-engined variant of the F-86A, two built.
YF-93A
Two prototype F-86Cs redesignated,
F-93A
Production variant, order for 118 cancelled.

Specifications (YF-93A)

See also

References

Notes

Bibliography

 Angelucci, Enzo and Peter Bowers. The American Fighter. Sparkford, UK: Haynes Publishing Group, 1987. .
 Davis, Larry. F-86 Sabre in action. Carrollton, Texas: Squadron/Signal Publications, 1992. .
 Pace, Steve. X-Fighters: USAF Experimental and Prototype Fighters, XP-59 to YF-23. Osceola, Wisconsin: Motorbooks International, 1991. .
 Sgarlato, Nico and Franco Ragni. U.S. Fighters of the Fifties. Carrollton, Texas: Squadron/Signal Publications, 1979. .
 Wagner, Ray. The North American Sabre. London: Macdonald, 1963. No ISBN.

External links

 National Museum of the USAF: North American YF-93A Fact Sheet
 The F-86C/YF-93 "Sabre"
 North American F-86C/YF-93A
 AMERICAN NOTEBOOK – Derby Entrant – a report on the YF-93 – Flight Archive, 18 May 1950

F-93
1950s United States fighter aircraft
Single-engined jet aircraft
Low-wing aircraft
Cancelled military aircraft projects of the United States
YF-93
Aircraft first flown in 1950